Geraldus d'Anduze (Géraud d'Anduze) was a French prelate, bishop of Nîmes in the eleventh century.

Geraldus was the son of Bernard Pelet, Lord of Anduze, and of Ermengarde, his first wife. His brother Fredol was bishop of Puy.
 
Like his predecessor , Geraldus gave much attention to the reconstruction of Psalmody Abbey, which regained its former lustre through the virtues of the religious and the munificence of the laity. During his time, the abbey was granted jurisdiction over an abbey at Saint-Geniez.

See also 
 Catholic Church in France
 Roman Catholic Diocese of Nîmes

References

11th-century French Roman Catholic bishops
Bishops of Nîmes